This is a list of fungi placed in the genus Candida.

References

Candida (fungus)
Candida